Kwegu (also Bacha, Koegu, Kwegi, Menja, Nidi) is a Surmic language spoken in the Southwest of Ethiopia, on the west bank of the Omo River.

References

 Hieda, Osamu. 1998. "A sketch of Koegu grammar: Towards reconstructing Proto-Southeastern Surmic" in Gerrit Dimmendaal and Marco Last (eds.), Surmic Languages and Cultures. Köln: Rüdiger Köppe Verlag. pp 345–373.

External links
 World Atlas of Language Structures information on Kwegu
 Kwegu basic lexicon at the Global Lexicostatistical Database
 ELAR archive of Koegu (Kwegu)

Languages of Ethiopia
Surmic languages